Murray Paul Sullivan (March 14, 1925 - November 11, 2018) was a Canadian football player who played for the Toronto Argonauts. He won the Grey Cup with them in 1945, 1946 and 1947. He was an alumnus of St. Michael's College, Toronto.

References

1925 births
2018 deaths
Canadian football people from Toronto
Toronto Argonauts players
Canadian football running backs
Players of Canadian football from Ontario